Bahriyeh (also Romanized as Baḩrīyeh; also known as Barīyeh and Baria) is a village in Chah Salem Rural District, in the Central District of Omidiyeh County, Khuzestan Province, Iran. At the 2006 census, its population was 226, in 36 families.

References 

Populated places in Omidiyeh County